Australian Patience is a patience or card solitaire using one deck of playing cards. This game is a challenging combination of Klondike and Scorpion, and is also closely related to Yukon. The object of the game is to move all of the cards to the Foundations.

Rules

Australian Patience has four Foundations build up in suit from Ace to King, e.g. A♣, 2♣, 3♣, 4♣...

The seven depots of the Tableau are filled with piles of four cards each, which build down in suit, e.g. 8♥, 7♥, 6♥, 5♥...

Like Yukon, any face-up card can be moved, but all the unrelated cards on top of it will be moved also. Only a King (with or without a pile) can be moved to an empty space.

Only one card is turned up at a time from the Deck, and these cards can be played onto the depots or the Foundations. Australian Patience only allows one pass through the deck.

Variations

Due to dependence on luck of the draw, only about 20% of games can be won.  Several variations increase the chances of completing the game successfully by introducing rules to allow a single redeal of the stock (Canberra), unlimited redeals (Tasmanian Solitaire), or a different starting tableau (Brisbane).

Australian Patience can be played as a race game for two players.

See also
 Yukon
 List of patiences and solitaires
 Glossary of patience and solitaire terms

Notes

Single-deck patience card games
Mobile games
Competitive patience card games
Australian card games